Evje is a former municipality in the old Aust-Agder county in Norway. The  municipality existed from 1877 until 1960. It was located in what is now the eastern part of the present-day municipality of Evje og Hornnes in the Setesdal valley of Agder county. The administrative centre was the village of Evje where the Evje Church is located.

History
The municipality of Evje was created on 1 January 1877 when the old municipality of Evje og Vegusdal was divided into Evje (population: 870) and Vegusdal (population: 935). During the 1960s, there were many municipal mergers across Norway due to the work of the Schei Committee. On 1 January 1960, Evje (population: 1,646) was merged with the neighboring municipality of Hornnes (population: 1,280) to form the new municipality of Evje og Hornnes.

Name
The municipality (originally the parish) of Evje is named after an old Evje farm, since the first church was built there. The name is identical with the word efja which means "eddy", probably referring to the nearby river Otra.

Government

The municipal council  of Evje was made up of 17 representatives that were elected to four year terms.  The party breakdown of the final municipal council was as follows:

Notable residents
Torvald Haavardstad (1893–1965), a Norwegian politician
Helena Iren Michaelsen (born 1977), a Norwegian rock singer

See also
List of former municipalities of Norway

References

External links

Setesdal
Evje og Hornnes
Former municipalities of Norway
1877 establishments in Norway
1960 disestablishments in Norway